Ralava Beboarimisa (born 1977) is a Malagasy politician. He was Minister of Environment, Ecology, Sea, and Forest from 2015 to 2016. He was then Ministry of Transport and Meteorology of Madagascar from 2017 to 2019, firstly during two Governments of Jean Ravelonarivo and Olivier Solonandrasana, and then during transition Government led by Christian Ntsay because of the April 21, 2018 crisis.

Beboarimisa studied finance and international relationship. He acquired his first professional experiences in investment banks in France before returning to Madagascar in 2011. He then held the post of Executive Director of the Foundation for Protected Areas and Biodiversity of Madagascar for 4 years (FAPBM). FAPBM is one of the largest environmental foundation in Africa and also founding member of the Consortium of African Funds for Environment (CAFE) that Beboarimisa chaired. During his contract with FAPBM, Madagascar was particularly highlighted internationally as FAPBM led a delegation of more than 60 people from many environmental associations, NGOs and communities at the IUCN World Parks Congress 2014 in Sydney Australia.

One of the biggest problems Beboarimisa faced during his tenure as minister of the environment was the rapid deforestation and threat to the flora and fauna of the island that Madagascar is undergoing. The first law he helped pass was the so-called "Beboarimisa law", which toughened sanctions for cutting down rosewoods in Madagascar.

Beboarimisa's hard tactics toward combating deforestation made him a popular figure in the country, and for a brief period of time it was rumored that he might succeed Jean Ravelonarivo as the next prime minister. However, Beboarimisa came under scrutiny in April 2016 after more than 1,000 tons of rosewood were discovered in the possession of a Hong Kong businessman in Singapore, leading to questions of how such a large amount could have been smuggled out of the country. Following the effervescence of traffics, a law was even drawn up, called the "Beboarimisa" law to strengthen the fight at a legal level. United States support for international legal proceedings  .In 2019 the Court of Appeal in Singapore quashed all convictions related to the case. Ruling that the logs had only been intransit through Singapore, and not imported into Singapore.  In August 2017, following a government reshuffle, Beboarimisa returned to government ministry to be at the head of the Ministry of Transport and Meteorology.

In October 2018, the 60th anniversary of the Republic of Madagascar, he decided to create a non-profit organization called "Bâtir la République"  to encourage citizens' involvement and empowerment in the democratic debate, mindful of the importance of citizen involvement observed during the first edition in 2018, further debates were held in the following years. The 1st Republic of Madagascar was born on October 14, 1958 while independence was obtained two years later on June 26, 1960. October 14 is generally a forgotten day however "Batir la République" decided to put it forward.

References

External links

Bâtir la République page on Facebook

1978 births
Living people
Environmental scientists
Government ministers of Madagascar
Malagasy scientists